Kensington Publishing Corp. is an American, New Yorkbased publishing house founded in 1974 by Walter Zacharius (1923–2011) and Roberta Bender Grossman (1946–1992). Kensington is known as “America’s Independent Publisher.” It remains a multi-generational family business, with Steven Zacharius succeeding his father as president and CEO, and Adam Zacharius as general manager.

It is the house of many New York Times bestselling authors, including Fern Michaels, Lisa Jackson, Joanne Fluke and William W. Johnstone. In addition to the over 500 new titles that the company publishes each year, it has a vast and diverse backlist that includes classics such as The Minority Report by Philip K. Dick, Johnny Got His Gun by Dalton Trumbo, I Hope They Serve Beer in Hell by Tucker Max and Being and Nothingness by Jean-Paul Sartre.

Kensington's imprints include Zebra Books, Pinnacle Books, Dafina, Citadel Press, and Lyrical Press, which provide readers with a range of popular genres such as romance, military thrillers and espionage, women's fiction, African American, young adult and nonfiction, as well as true-crime, western, and mystery titles.

History 
Kensington Books was founded by Walter Zacharius and Roberta Bender Grossman in 1974 as the successor to the paperback publisher Lancer Books, specializing in paperback romance novels. The Zebra Books and Pinnacle Books imprints debuted in 1975. Rather than bookstores, the company's books were generally sold in railroad stations, airports, bus terminals, and drug stores.

In 2008, Kensington acquired the publishing assets of Holloway House (publishers of Iceberg Slim and Donald Goines).

Co-founder Walter Zacharius died in 2011. In addition to having run Lancer Books from 1961 to 1973, Zacharius authored the World War II novel Songbird, published by Simon & Schuster in 2004 and republished  by Kensington Books in 2007 as The Memories We Keep.

In 2022, Kensington acquired speculative fiction publisher Erewhon Books.

Management
Steven Zacharius, son of founder Walter Zacharius, has been with the company since 1993 and has been president and CEO since 2005. He is also chairman of Kensington. The company's senior vice president, Michael Rosamilia, has been the CFO since 1989. Adam Zacharius, Steven's son, is the Vice President - General Manager and originally started working with Kensington seven years ago.  Kensington is believed to be the only publishing company with three generations of family management.

The staff totals over 85 employees and, in addition to its internal sales team, Kensington has a distribution agreement with Penguin Random House Publisher Services’ global sales force.

Imprints
 Kensington Books — commercial fiction, romance
 Citadel — general non-fiction
 Dafina — African-American literature
 Lyrical Press — digital-first
 Pinnacle Books — thrillers, true crime, westerns
 Rebel Base — digital-first sci-fi and fantasy
 Urban Soul — African-American literature
 Zebra Books — Science fiction, fantasy, romance

Authors

References

External links
 

Book publishing companies based in New York (state)
Paranormal fiction
Publishing companies established in 1974
Erotic publishers
Romance book publishing companies
1974 establishments in New York City